Maria Monteiro Jardin was the Angolan minister for fisheries in the 1994 government of José Eduardo dos Santos.

See also
Politics of Angola

References

Living people
Year of birth missing (living people)
Place of birth missing (living people)
20th-century Angolan politicians
Government ministers of Angola